Anticult is the seventh studio album by Polish death metal band Decapitated. It was released on 7 July 2017 by Nuclear Blast. It is the band's only album with bassist Hubert Więcek and their final album with drummer Michał Łysejko.

Background
Daniel Bergstrand produced drums and mixed the album. Guitarist Wacław "Vogg" Kiełtyka stated about the songwriting process: "[This] album is one that we created together as a band. Our drummer, Michał [Łysejko], [helped] a lot with the arrangements and the songs. He's like the co-author of the songs. It's like I used to do with Vitek [Witold Kiełtyka]."

Reception

The song "One-Eyed Nation" was premiered by Alternative Press, which the magazine reviewed as "classic Decapitated: killer riffs, interesting leads and an undeniable sense of groove"; and described the band as "remaining one of death metal's elite" bands. Andy Walmsley of Terrorizer praised the album and described the band's development as "one of constant evolution, steadily incorporating more elements of groove, thrash, tech, and prog over the years, with every new album signifying a conscious state-change from the one before it." He concluded that Decapitated are "on their quest towards becoming the quintessential modern metal band."

Track listing

Personnel
Decapitated
 Rafał "Rasta" Piotrowski – vocals
 Wacław "Vogg" Kiełtyka – guitars, bass, piano
 Michał Łysejko – drums
 Hubert Więcek – bass

Production
 Daniel Bergstrand – drums production, mixing
 Wacław "Vogg" Kiełtyka – production
 Jan Galbas – engineering
 Tomasz "Zed" Zalewski – engineering
 Lukasz Lukaszewski – assistant engineer
 Lawrence Mackrory – mastering
 Lukasz Jaszak – cover art and layout
 Oskar Szramka – photography

Charts

References

2017 albums
Decapitated (band) albums
Nuclear Blast albums